Lanxess Arena (originally Kölnarena, German for Cologne Arena) is an indoor arena, in Cologne, North Rhine-Westphalia, Germany. It is known as the 18,500-capacity home of the Kölner Haie. The arena opened in 1998 and can accommodate 20,000 people for concerts. With its capacity of 18,500, it is the largest ice hockey arena outside North America.

It is primarily used by Kölner Haie (ice hockey), VfL Gummersbach (handball), Köln RheinStars (basketball), and as a concert venue. Lanxess Arena was the highest-attended arena of 2019, with 699,924  tickets sold.

The arena is spanned by a steel arch supporting the roof via steel cables.

On June 2, 2008, it was announced that Kölnarena would be renamed Lanxess Arena, for a period of ten years. The sponsor, Lanxess AG, is a specialty chemicals group based in the Lanxess Tower in Deutz, Cologne.

Concerts 
Lanxess Arena has been one of the top entertainment venues in Cologne since its opening. Many international artists have performed at the venue, spanning a wide range of music genres. Artists that have performed their concerts at the venue are listed in the table below.

Sports events 
The arena was used for the 2007 World Men's Handball Championship, including the third place game and the final game.

On June 13, 2009, the Ultimate Fighting Championships held UFC 99 at the Lanxess Arena. This was the first time the UFC has made its way to Germany.

On May 29–30, 2010, the arena hosted the EHF Champions League Final Four.

The arena was one of the venues for the 2010 IIHF World Championship, including both semi-finals, the Bronze medal game and the Championship game.

On August 22–23, 2015, the arena hosted ESL One Cologne 2015, one of three major Counter-Strike: Global Offensive tournaments to be held throughout 2015.

On July 5–10, 2016, the arena hosted ESL One Cologne 2016, the second $1,000,000 Counter-Strike: Global Offensive major tournament.

From May 5 to 21, 2017, the arena co-hosted the IIHF ice hockey world championship, including all the final games.

On July 7–9, 2017, the arena hosted ESL One Cologne 2017, a Counter-Strike: Global Offensive tournament with a prize pool of $250,000.

From July 6 to 8, 2018, the arena hosted ESL One Cologne 2018. This event earned Lanxess Arena the nickname “The Cathedral Of Counter-Strike”.

On October 8, 2018, the arena hosted an exhibition ice hockey game between Kölner Haie and the Edmonton Oilers, part of the 2018 NHL Global Series Challenge.

On July 5–7, 2019, the arena hosted another edition of the ESL One Cologne, a Counter-Strike: Global Offensive tournament with a prize pool of $300,000.

From July 12 to 13, 2019, the arena will host the 2019 German Darts Masters, part of the Professional Darts Corporation World Series.

From May 22 to 24, 2020, the arena will host the 2020 Euroleague Final Four, part of Euroleague Basketball

In 2020 the arena hosted back to back ATP 250 events. From October 11–18, Bett1Hulks Indoors and from October 17 to 25 it will host another ATP 250 event Bett1Hulks Championship

The venue will host some group phase matches at the FIBA EuroBasket 2022 which the country and Berlin alongside Czech Republic in Prague, Georgia in Tbilisi and Italy in Milan.

Image gallery

See also
List of indoor arenas in Germany
List of European ice hockey arenas

Notes

External links

 

Sports venues completed in 1998
Indoor arenas in Germany
Indoor ice hockey venues in Germany
Basketball venues in Germany
Handball venues in Germany
Landmarks in Cologne
Sports venues in Cologne
Convention centres in Germany
Venues of the Bundesvision Song Contest
1998 establishments in Germany